The Cambodian Red Cross (CRC;) is the largest humanitarian organization in Cambodia. Established on 18 February 1955, it is officially recognized by the Royal Government as the primary auxiliary to the public authorities in humanitarian services. It was recognized by the International Committee on October 7, 1960, and admitted as a Member of the International Federation of Red Cross and Red Crescent Societies on October 8, 1960.

References

External links
Red Cross website
Cambodian Red Cross Profile

Medical and health organisations based in Cambodia
1955 establishments in Cambodia
Red Cross and Red Crescent national societies
Organizations established in 1955